The American Indian Film Festival is an annual non-profit film festival in San Francisco, California, United States. It is the world's oldest venue dedicated  solely to Native American/First Nations films and prepared the way for the 1979 formation of the American Indian Film Institute.

According to the Institute, the Festival was first presented in Seattle, Washington in 1975 and moved in 1977 to San Francisco, where it remains today. In 1979, the Festival was incorporated.

Over 3,100 films have been screened from Native American/First Nations communities in the U.S. and Canada, and the festival includes events such as film screenings, panel discussions, an awards ceremony and networking events.

This festival is not to be confused by the Native American Film and Video Festival, which was founded in 1979.

Winners

Best Film

Best Director

Best Actor

Best Actress

References

External links

 American Indian Film Institute homepage

Native American film festivals
Film festivals in the San Francisco Bay Area
Indigenous peoples of California topics
Native American history of California
Arts organizations based in the San Francisco Bay Area
Non-profit organizations based in San Francisco
1975 establishments in Washington (state)
Film festivals established in 1975